Aktash, from Turkic "" (lit. whitestone), is the name of several rural localities in Russia.

Modern localities
Aktash, Altai Republic, a selo in Aktashskoye Rural Settlement of Ulagansky District of the Altai Republic
Aktash, Republic of Tatarstan, a station in Almetyevsky District of the Republic of Tatarstan

Alternative names
Aktash, alternative name of Russky Aktash, a selo in Almetyevsky District of the Republic of Tatarstan
Aktash, alternative name of Verkhny Aktash, a selo in Almetyevsky District of the Republic of Tatarstan

See also
Maly Aktash, a settlement in Aksubayevsky District of the Republic of Tatarstan